The 2010 Hazfi Cup Final was a two-legged football tie in order to determine the 2009–10 Hazfi Cup champion of Iranian football clubs. Persepolis faced Gostaresh Foolad in this final game. The first leg took place on May 13, 2010 at 16:00 IRDT (UTC+4:30) at Yadegar-e Emam Stadium in Tabriz and the second leg took place on May 24, 2010 at 16:00 local time (UTC+3:30) at Azadi Stadium, Tehran.

Format
The rules for the final were exactly the same as the one for the previous knockout rounds. The tie was contested over two legs with away goals deciding the winner if the two teams were level on goals after the second leg. If the teams could still not be separated at that stage, then extra time would have been played with a penalty shootout (taking place if the teams were still level after that).

Road to the finals

Final Summary 

|}

First leg

Second leg

Champions

See also 
 2009–10 Persian Gulf Cup
 2009–10 Azadegan League
 2009–10 Iran Football's 2nd Division
 2009–10 Iran Football's 3rd Division
 2009–10 Hazfi Cup
 Iranian Super Cup
 2009–10 Iranian Futsal Super League

References

2010
Haz
Persepolis F.C. matches